Paranomis sidemialis is a moth in the family Crambidae. It was described by Eugene G. Munroe and Akira Mutuura in 1968. It is found in Russia (Manchuria).

References

Moths described in 1968
Pyraustinae